The 2nd Cavalry Division was a cavalry division of the United States Army.

Heraldry
Shoulder sleeve insignia

Description: On a yellow Norman shield with a green border, a blue chevron below two eight-pointed blue stars.
Blazon:  Or, a chevron azure, in chief 2 mullets of eight points of the second, a bordure vert.
Symbolism: The shield is yellow, the Cavalry color. The stars (representing spur rowells) are taken from the coat of arms of the 2d Cavalry Regiment, which had initially been a part of the division.
Worn from 20 August 1921 – 10 May 1944

Lineage

Organization (1921–42)
On 20 August 1921, as a result of lessons learned from World War I, the US Army Adjutant General constituted the 1st and 2d Cavalry Divisions to meet future mobilization requirements. As organized, 2d Cavalry Division was to be an integrated division.

Units assigned to the 2nd Cavalry Division included:

3rd Cavalry Brigade : 15 October 1940 (Redesignated the 9th Armored Division Train on 15 July 1942.)
  2nd Cavalry Regiment : 15 August 1927 (Transferred on 15 July 1942 to 9th Armored Division), reorganized as 2d Cavalry Group (Mechanized) in 1943).
  14th Cavalry Regiment : 1 April 1941 (Transferred on 15 July 1942 to 9th Armored Division), reorganized as 14th Cavalry Group (Mechanized) in 1943).
Weapons Troop
4th Cavalry Brigade (Cld) : 21 February 1941 (Inactivated on 23 March 1944)
  9th Cavalry Regiment (Cld) : 10 October 1940
  10th Cavalry Regiment (Cld) : 24 March 1923 (Transferred to 3rd Cavalry Division on 15 August 1927). Transferred to 2d Cavalry Division on 10 October 1940.
Weapons Troop (Cld)
Headquarters and Headquarters Battery, Division Artillery
  3rd Field Artillery Battalion (75mm)
  16th Field Artillery Battalion (75mm)
HQ & HQ Troop, 2nd Cavalry Division
  9th Engineer Squadron (Motorized)
2d Medical Squadron
17th Quartermaster Squadron
92d Reconnaissance Squadron
2d Antitank Troop
2d Signal Troop 
24th Ordnance Medium Maintenance Company

Organization (1943–44)
Division headquarters reactivated on 25 February 1943 at Fort Clark. Mobilized for deployment to North Africa 12 January 1944. Inactivated in Oran, Algeria on 9 March 1944. Components used to create service and labor units.

 Headquarters and Headquarters Troop, 2nd Cavalry Division (Inactivated 10 May 1944)
 4th Cavalry Brigade : Activated 21 February 1941. Inactivated 23 March 1944; assets converted into the 6495th Engineer Heavy Pontoon Battalion, Provisional (Colored); later converted into the 1553rd Engineer Heavy Pontoon Battalion (Colored).
  10th Cavalry Regiment : 24 March 1923 (Transferred to 3d Cavalry Division on 15 August 1927. Returned to 2d Cavalry Division on 10 October 1940. Inactivated 10 March 1944; assets converted into the 6486th Engineer Construction Battalion, Provisional (Colored) on 20 March 1944; later converted into the 1334th Engineer Construction Battalion (Colored) on 29 March 1944.
  28th Cavalry : Activated at Fort Lockett on 25 February 1943. Inactivated 31 March 1944; assets converted into the 6487th Engineer Construction Battalion, Provisional (Colored) on 31 March 1944; later converted into the 134th Quartermaster Battalion (Mobile)(Colored).
5th Cavalry Brigade : Activated 25 February 1943. Inactivated 12 June 1944; assets converted into the 6400th Ordnance Ammunition Battalion (Provisional) on 12 June 1944.
  9th Cavalry Regiment : Assigned 10 October 1940. Broken up and personnel reassigned to various service units on 7 March 1944.
  27th Cavalry Regiment : Activated 25 February 1943. Inactivated 27 March 1944; assets converted into the 6404th Port Battalion on 31 March 1944.
 2nd Cavalry Division Artillery (Colored) Inactivated 10 March 1944.
  77th Field Artillery Battalion (Colored)(75mm) Inactivated 26 February 1944.
  78th Field Artillery Battalion (Colored)(75mm) Inactivated 10 March 1944.
 159th Field Artillery Battalion (105mm)(Colored): Did not deploy to North Africa.
 35th Cavalry Reconnaissance Squadron (Mechanized) (Colored) (Inactivated 25 March 1944)
 162nd Engineer Squadron (Colored) (Inactivated 22 March 1944)
 3rd Medical Squadron (Colored) (Inactivated 24 May 1944)
 2nd Cavalry Division Military Police Platoon (Colored) (Inactivated 1 June 1944)
 20th Cavalry Quartermaster Squadron (Colored) (Inactivated 23 March 1944)
 114th Ordnance Medium Maintenance Company (Colored) (Inactivated 7 March 1944)

World War II

Constituted in 1921, the 2nd Cavalry Division was not activated until April 1941. As part of the Protective Mobilization Plan, the division was reserved for activation at Fort Riley, Kansas, but due to manpower constraints it never reached full strength. The 2nd received the appropriate number of cavalry regiments, but units providing the organic support and service troops remained unfilled. The first divisional activations came in October 1940, with the organization of the 3rd Cavalry Brigade and the assignment of the 2nd Cavalry Regiment and 14th Cavalry Regiment. The 4th Cavalry Brigade activated during February 1941 with the 9th Cavalry Regiment and 10th Cavalry Regiment as its cavalry regiments. These last two regiments, the only two available for assignment, were black units. The division, therefore, was unique to Army structure at that time, a racially mixed unit.

Split between Fort Riley and Camp Funston, Kansas, neither post having adequate facilities for the division's horse cavalry, personnel shortages continued, and divisional elements were activated using provisional assets. General Millikin, the 2nd Cavalry Division commander in June 1941, envisioned a combined use of mechanized and horse cavalry within the division. During July, Troop A, 2n Reconnaissance Squadron, was formed provisionally as a mechanized divisional element. The division, now organized with horses, scout cars, jeeps and motorcycles, spent most of the rest of the summer training with its new equipment.

The 2nd Cavalry Division participated in the Second Army Maneuvers of late August as a component of the Red Forces facing the VII Corps' Blue Army. Given the task of capturing Arkansas and Louisiana, the 2nd's mission ended on 9 September with divisional elements at Chatham, Louisiana. During the next week the division became part of a second training operation. This time the division served with the Second Army's Red Force, now challenging the Third Army's Blue Force. Second Army's first goal was to defeat and remove the Blue Forces from southern Louisiana, and then to keep the enemy from capturing Shreveport. At the close of these maneuvers the 2nd Cavalry Division returned to Kansas, having prevailed with Blue Forces still forty miles from the city.

By 2 November the division possessed a number of its organic support troops, although most were still functioning in a provisional status. The end of the month found the division involved in another set of training maneuvers. The operation, "PRACTICE BLITZKRIEG," was based in Kansas and finished with the 2nd Cavalry Division's capture of Topeka. The exercise ended when the divisional military police unit seized the governor who feigned a surrender of the state.

The surprise attack on Pearl Harbor triggered fears of assaults on the west coast and invasion threats from south of the border. A new emphasis was placed on the continent's western defenses and the division deployed its 3rd Brigade to Arizona. General Coulter, the brigade commander, was also given command of the Southern Land Frontier Sector of the Western Defense Command. Under him the 2nd Cavalry, stationed at Phoenix, and the 14th Cavalry, at Tucson, patrolled the Mexican Border for the next seven months. Meanwhile, the 4th Cavalry Brigade, still at Camp Funston, continuing an endless cycle of training. Constantly called on to provide cadres for new units, the 9th and 10th Cavalry routinely lost veteran personnel and received untrained recruits.

During the spring of 1942 a War Department decision to increase the number of armored divisions within the United States Army resulted in the planned conversion of the 2nd Cavalry Division. White troops in the 3d Brigade were used in the formation of the 9th Armored Division. The 2nd and 14th Cavalry were inactivated and their personnel transferred into the newly formed 2nd and 14th Armored Regiments, both elements of the new armored division. On 15 July 1942 the 2nd Cavalry Division was inactivated. The 4th Cavalry Brigade with its black regiments, however, remained active.

The activation of the 9th Armored Division created logistical problems at Fort Riley and Camp Funston. The installations that had accommodated a single division were now home to a division and an additional cavalry brigade. Consequently, the 4th Cavalry Brigade Headquarters and the 10th Cavalry relocated to Camp Lockett, California. The 9th Cavalry, although still assigned to the brigade, moved to Fort Clark, Texas.

As the number of black personnel entering the Army rose, the need for segregated units for these soldiers to join also increased. In November 1942 the War Department directed that the 2nd Cavalry Division would be reactivated, and that two new black regiments would be assigned. It was also announced that the 2nd, now the Army's third black division, would remain divided between Texas and California. Construction was started at both posts since neither had the facilities to support an entire division. The work completed, the 2nd Cavalry Division activated on 25 February 1943 with headquarters at Fort Clark. The 9th and 27th Cavalry, active at the Texas post, were the assigned troops of the 5th Cavalry Brigade. The 10th Cavalry and the 28th Cavalry, located at Camp Lockett, made up the 4th Cavalry Brigade.

Filled using recruits straight from the induction centers, the 2nd Division spent most of the spring and summer of 1943 training its soldiers. The division provided these men with their basic training as well as instruction in cavalry operations. The divisional training as a whole, however, would not be tested. Stating that there was no intrinsic need for a second cavalry division, the War Department had devised a plan to use the 2nd Cavalry Division personnel to form needed service units. Black community leaders, reacting against the criticism of the performance of African Americans in combat units, protested the possible conversion of the division. The debate over the capabilities of black units continued but the decision concerning the status of the 2nd Cavalry Division was already made. The War Department ordered the division to be shipped overseas where the conversion would take place. During January 1944 the 2nd Cavalry Division was dismounted and shipped back east for deployment abroad. Arriving at Oran, North Africa, on 9 March 1944, elements of the division were gradually inactivated until the 2nd Cavalry Division itself ceased to exist on 10 May 1944.

The division was never engaged in combat, and was instead assigned to construct airfields for the Tuskegee Airmen in North Africa and perform garrison and supply duties there. The division also provided replacement troops for the all-black 92nd Infantry Division which was heavily engaged in combat in Italy.

Commanders
Brigadier General Terry de la Mesa Allen Sr.: 1 April 1941 – May 1941
Brigadier General John Millikin: June 1941 – April 1942
Brigadier General John B. Coulter: May 1942 – 15 July 1942
Major General Harry H. Johnson: 25 February 1943 – 10 May 1944.

See also
 Buffalo Soldier
 List of armored and cavalry regiments of the United States Army
 United States Army branch insignia

References

 U.S. Army Order of Battle 1919–1941, Volume 2. The Arms: Cavalry, Field Artillery, and Coast Artillery, 1919–41 by Lieutenant Colonel (Retired) Steven E. Clay, Combat Studies Institute Press, Fort Leavenworth, KS, 2011
 Maneuver and Firepower, The Evolution of Divisions and Separate Brigades, by John B. Wilson, Center of Military History, Washington D.C., 1998
 Cavalry Regiments of the U S Army by James A. Sawicki Wyvern Pubns; June 1985

External links
 African Americans in the U.S. Army – ARMY.MIL
 The Army Almanac: Combat Chronicles of World War II.
 Camp Lockett, CA

African-American history of the United States military
Cavalry Division, 02
02
Military units and formations established in 1921
Military units and formations disestablished in 1944